Dellamarie Parrilli is an American painter and visual artist and record producer who is noted for her evolving, self-taught abstract style that encompasses numerous genres and media.  Parrilli's art has been in gallery exhibitions in Europe and the United States, particularly in Chicago and New York.

Prior to 2000 (when she turned to visual arts and painting as her full-time focus), Parrilli was a singer. More recently, she was executive producer of the album Angels Bend Closer (2016) by Canadian singer/songwriter Jane Siberry.

Early career

Parrilli began singing at age 11 after her father was killed by a drunk driver; months later, her family was left homeless after surviving a devastating house fire. Parrilli embraced creativity and began to express her pain and suffering through music, writing, and art.

She graduated from DePaul University in 1971 with a Bachelor of Arts in Music. Under the stage name "Dellamarie", Parrilli headlined at the Sahara in Las Vegas in 1979, and produced and performed a one-woman variety show act that a contemporary review noted to be influenced by "Judy Garland, Liza Minnelli and Jacques Brel". Parrilli released a private-issue LP entitled Dellamaire which featured a six-song Judy Garland medley and a collection of standards and showtunes.

In 1992, Parrilli's show "Judy: The Songs and Stories of a Legend" was about to open on Broadway, when Parrilli was diagnosed with Sjögren's syndrome and Lyme disease. The two conditions left her unable to sing, and abruptly ended her singing and performance career.

In 1998, Parrilli and a partner opened a restaurant in Chicago named Hoxie's, which won the Chicago Tribune Dining Poll for "Best New Restaurant" one month after it opened. The restaurant closed in 2000, after Parrilli contracted a bacterial infection from wounds inflicted by a dog in two separate attacks. After her recovery, Parrilli suffered a bronchial infection from toxic mold discovered in her home.

As a visual artist

Parrilli turned to art as a full-time pursuit after her bouts with illness. Parrilli's first public art exhibition was held in the gallery of the Fine Arts Building (Chicago) in Chicago in February 2002 and was followed by long run of exhibitions in New York and Chicago. Parrilli's art has received numerous awards, and her work is featured in numerous private and corporate collections throughout the United States.

Art critic Ed McCormack described Parrilli's self-taught style as "adventurous and constantly evolving", and Schirmer Encyclopedia of Art author Ann Landi noted that Parrilli had "developed her own expressionist vocabulary," while also noting the "obvious sophistication and parallels with mainstream modernism" that distinguished her work. NY Arts magazine praised Parrilli on her "audacity to tackle seemingly worn-out formulas, to give them a mighty shake, and to conjure something that is all her own."

Evolution of style

Parrilli's early works (circa 2002-2004) utilized oils that were applied with "staccato pallet knife strokes", and were often characterized by the frequent use of a "distinctive violet hue." McCormack called her "one of the most worthy successors to the action painters," and noted that her use of saturated color "conveys the sensation of light rather than inert pigment".  Curator Ruthie Tucker claimed that Parrilli's early work "express[es] the struggle with light and color," and "achieves a rarity in the genre of abstract painting: she creates art that is inherently dynamic and meditative."  Parrilli opted to work directly on the canvas without utilizing preliminary sketches, which created a spontaneity that Metropolitan Museum of Art lecturer Nancy di Benedetto claimed "flows and pulsates with a resonance from the world around her." di Benedetto also pointed out the strong influence of Parrilli's performing career upon her early art, stating that Parrilli "literally sings and dances on the canvases."

By 2007, Parrilli's style continued to use oils, but had changed to a layered pour and drip technique. Although created in a style similar to Jackson Pollock, this period of Parrilli's work also dabbled in a style that alluded to Asian screen painting, and included a set of paintings that were "dominated by large, bold areas of bright primaries."  Parrilli continued to utilize the violet hues she favored previously, as well as bright colors in "unlikely-yet-complementary color combinations" that prompted McCormack to comment that "it often appears that she has dipped her brush in liquid light rather than physical pigment."

Parrilli's fascination with light would gain even more prominence as her art developed. In 2008, Parrilli began a nine-month search to find materials conducive to conveying an even stronger luminescence.  This search led Parrilli to find and use a polycarbonate sheeting normally used for industrial purposes. This set of polycarbon based works continued to draw influence from Eastern painting techniques, "embrac[ing] both Eastern and Western picture-making strategies without coming down firmly on one side or the other."

In the 2010s, Parrilli moved to Los Angeles, where she employed even more disparate and unusual media and techniques. As of 2014, her Los Angeles-based work operates in several separate and distinct styles, those being three-dimensional polycarbon on acrylic cubes; large watercolors on canvas with added acrylic textures and/or "wet on wet" painting techniques; and similarly large acrylic on canvas paintings that McCormack described as "muscular and "juicy", with enormous paint strokes "broad enough to have been painted with a broom rather than an ordinary brush."

Exhibitions

Parrilli's work has been exhibited in many U.S. and European galleries. Solo exhibitions of her work include: "Reflections: Journeys Within And Beyond" (2002), Fine Arts Building gallery, Chicago, IL; "Between Here … And There" (2006) and "Rhapsodic Abstractions: Variations On A Theme" (2007), Ezair Gallery, Southampton, New York; "Into The Light" (2008), Walter Wickiser Gallery, New York, NY; "Jackson Pollock Meets Bette Midler" and "Beyond Barriers" (2009), The Palmer Gallery, Chicago, IL.

Parrilli’s work has been featured in numerous group exhibitions, including: "Chelsea Global Competition" (2002), Amsterdam Whitney Fine Art Gallery, New York, NY; "Viridian Affiliate Artists" exhibition (2003), Viridian Artists, New York, NY; Vernita Nemec, Director; "Abstract Impressions" (2005), CCT Gallery, Northwestern University, Chicago, IL; "Evocative Expressions" (2006), Cork Gallery, Lincoln Center For The Performing Arts, NY; "Biennale Internazionale Dell'arte Contemporanea" (2007), Fortezza da Basso, Florence, Italy; "Moscow International Festival of Art—Traditions and Contemporaneity" (2009), Moscow, Russia; "Visual Interpretations" (2009) GalleriaZero, Barcelona, Spain; and "Lush Xhibit" (2009), Preston Contemporary Art Center, Misilla, New Mexico.

Honors and awards

Parrilli has received numerous awards and honors, including: Richard W. and Wanda Gardner Memorial Award (2002) for "Searching For The Divine", Northern Indiana Arts Association, 59th Annual Salon Show (juror: Paul Sierra); Manhattan Arts International Artist Showcase Award (2002) for "Manhattan Rhythm" in the "I Love Manhattan" competition (jurors: Edward Rubin and Renée Phillips); Best of Show, for "Rhapsody In Blue", Jazz: Visual Improvisations (2003), Target Gallery, Alexandria, VA (juror: Sam Gilliam, international artist); Chelsea Global Showcase Winner (2003) for "Manhattan Rhythm", Amsterdam Whitney International Fine Art, Inc.; Award Of Excellence (2003) for "Desire", Manhattan Arts International, 20th Anniversary Competition, New York, NY (jurors: Nancy di Benedetto, Renee Phillips, NY); Award Of Excellence (2003) for "Journey To Self Discovery", Manhattan Arts International, "The Healing Power Of Art", New York, NY; Artist Showcase Award Winner (2004) for "Life, Love And The Art Of Celebration", Manhattan Arts International, "The Healing Power Of Art" (juror: E. Jay Weiss).

As a record producer

In 2016, Parrilli served as executive producer of Canadian singer/songwriter Jane Siberry's album Angels Bend Closer. Parrilli also worked as art director and photographer for the album release. Siberry credited Parrilli for adding a renewed energy and focus to the album's arrangements. The album was featured in NPR All Things Considered's 2016 "The Year In Music" year-end review, and has received positive reviews from ABC News, The Associated Press and Popdose.

References

External links
Official website
Dellamarie Parrilli

1949 births
Living people
American women painters
American women singers
American jewelry designers
American musical theatre actresses
Painters from Illinois
21st-century American women artists
Artists from Chicago
Women jewellers